The 1945 South Dakota State Jackrabbits football team was an American football team that represented South Dakota State University in the North Central Conference during the 1945 college football season. In its fourth season under head coach Thurlo McCrady, the team compiled a 1–4–1 record and was outscored by a total of 144 to 51.

Schedule

References

South Dakota State
South Dakota State Jackrabbits football seasons
South Dakota State Jackrabbits football